The Hermann Kesten Prize, formally the Hermann Kesten Medal, is a German literary award presented annually for outstanding efforts in support of persecuted writers, on behalf of PEN Centre Germany according to the principles of the Charter of International PEN. In 1985, the PEN Center of the Federal Republic of Germany awarded the first Hermann Kesten Medal. It is named in honor of the German novelist and dramatist Hermann Kesten (1900–1996).

Until 1993, it was awarded every two years, since 1994 it has been given annually.

The award is one of many PEN awards sponsored by International PEN affiliates in over 145 PEN centres around the world.

Prize winners
Source:

1985 Bishop Helmut Frentz
1987 Kathleen von Simson
1989 Angelika Mechtel
1991 Christa Bremer
1993 Johannes Mario Simmel
1994 Carola Stern
1995 Günter Grass
1996 Victor Pfaff
1997 SAID
1998 Hermann Schulz
1999 Alexander Tkatshenko
2000 Nenad Popovic
2001 Harold Pinter
2002 Sumaya Farhat Naser and Gila Svirsky
2003 Anna Politkovskaya
2004 Bunt statt Braun
2005 Journaliste en danger
2006 Leonie Ossowski
2007 Hrant Dink
2008 Memorial
2009 Baltasar Garzón
2010 Liu Xiaobo
2011 Egyptian Publisher Mohammed Hashim
2012 Iryna Khalip (Iрына Халiп) Belarusian Journalist
2013 Index on Censorship
2014 Wolfgang Kaleck
2015 Gefangenes Wort e.V. and Madjid Mohit
2016 Translate for Justice
2017 Thomas B. Schumann
2018 Gioconda Belli
2019 Philippe Lançon
2020 Günther Wallraff
2021 Irena Brežná
2022 Meena Kandasamy

See also
German literature
List of literary awards
List of poetry awards
List of years in literature
List of years in poetry

References

External links
 Hermann Kesten webpage
German P.E.N. Center

German PEN Center awards
Awards established in 1985
1985 establishments in Germany
Literary awards honouring human rights